Thomas Joseph McCleskey Jr. (born April 10, 1970) is a former American football defensive back in the National Football League (NFL) who is currently a secondary coach for the Tulane Green Wave football team. He played for the New Orleans Saints and Arizona Cardinals. He played college football at Tennessee.

His son, Jalen McCleskey, committed to Oklahoma State University to play college football in 2014. He later transferred to Tulane.

References

External links
 Tulane profile
 

1970 births
Living people
American football defensive backs
American football wide receivers
Arizona Cardinals players
New Orleans Saints players
Tennessee Volunteers football players
Tulane Green Wave football coaches
Sportspeople from Knoxville, Tennessee
Players of American football from Knoxville, Tennessee
African-American coaches of American football
African-American players of American football
21st-century African-American sportspeople
20th-century African-American sportspeople